The Congregation of the Missionary Sisters of Our Lady of the Apostles is a Roman Catholic religious congregation, founded in 1876 in Lyon, France, by Father Augustin Planque, the first Superior General of the Society of African Missions.

History 

Mother Eugenia Ravasio was Superior General from 1935 until 1947; she marked the history of the religious congregation for her work in favour of leprosy and for having received unprecedented visions and revelations from God the Father.

In 1995, Sister Angèle-Marie Littlejohn and Sister Bibiane Leclercq were killed by terrorism in Algiers. They are recognized as martyrs by the Catholic Church. Their beatification was celebrated on 8 December 2018 in Oran (Algeria) with the Martyrs of Algeria.

Apostolate 
The Congregation of the Missionary Sisters of Our Lady of the Apostles has currently more than 700 sisters from 21 countries in 19 countries. The sisters pronounce the three vows of poverty, chastity and obedience, for the realization of the first evangelization, the service of the poorest and the promotion of women, in an inter-religious dialogue: "we go beyond the borders of countries and of religions to boldly proclaim the dead and resurrected Christ to a multicultural world. We are a ferment of hope in a world in search of landmarks and in quest of Absolute. We are working on the first evangelization, especially in Africa. With respect, we welcome the truth of others and collaborate in the inculturation of the Gospel. We are attentive to the missionary dimension of the local Church. We live in effective solidarity with the poor, especially with women and all the persons who are marginalized in our contemporary societies".

References

Bibliography 
 Georges Goyau, Les Sœurs de Notre-Dame des Apôtres, Paris, Éditions Spes, 1936.
 Fr. André Ravier, Les Missionnaires de Notre-Dame des Apôtres, Lyon, Lescuyer, décembre 1944, 594 pages.
 Father Andrea D'Ascanio, FOR THE GLORY OF THE FATHER - A biography of Mother Eugenia Elisabetta Ravasio (1907-1990). Tip. Editrice Pisani - Isola del Liri, 94 pages.

External links 
 Congregation of the Missionary Sisters of Our Lady of the Apostles – Official website

Christianization
Catholic missionary orders
Catholic female orders and societies